Chrisman is a surname. Notable people with the surname include:

Arthur Bowie Chrisman (1889–1953), American writer
Drue Chrisman (born 1997), American football player
Jack Chrisman (1928–1989), American drag racer
James Chrisman (1818–1881), American lawyer and politician
Marshall Chrisman (born 1933), American businessman and politician
Robert Chrisman (1937–2013), American poet, academic and writer
William Chrisman (1822–1897), American lawyer and politician

See also 
Christman